Xiangyang is a town of Xiangfang District, Harbin, Heilongjiang, China. , it has one residential community and 8 villages under its administration.

References

Township-level divisions of Heilongjiang
Harbin